Dicraeopetalum stipulare is a species of flowering plant in the family Fabaceae. It is found in Ethiopia, Kenya, and Somalia. It is threatened by habitat loss.

References

Sophoreae
Flora of Ethiopia
Flora of Kenya
Flora of Somalia
Vulnerable plants
Taxonomy articles created by Polbot